Kalasin may refer to
the town Kalasin in Thailand
Kalasin Province in Thailand
Mueang Kalasin district, the capital district of Kalasin Province